Punjab Football Association (PFA), formerly the North-West India Football Association, is the state governing body of football in Punjab, India. It is affiliated with the All India Football Federation, the sports national governing body.

Punjab football structure
The Punjab football structure is based on two state level leagues, followed by the district leagues.

Women's competitions
Punjab Women's League

District associations

References

External links
 PFA Website

Football governing bodies in India
Football in Punjab, India
1932 establishments in India
Sports organizations established in 1932